Jatun Q'asa (Quechua jatun, hatun big, q'asa mountain pass,"big mountain pass", also spelled Jatun Khasa) is a  mountain in the Bolivian Andes. It is located in the Potosí Department, Tomás Frías Province, Yocalla Municipality. It lies east of the village of Puka Wasi (Puca Huasi).

References 

Mountains of Potosí Department